Eyimofe (Eyimofe: This Is My Desire) also known as This Is My Desire is a 2020 Nigerian drama film produced, written and directed by twin brothers Arie Esiri and Chuko Esiri on their directorial debuts. The film is made of two chapters called Spain and Italy. The film stars Jude Akuwudike and Temi Ami-Williams in the main lead roles. The film was opened to positive reviews from critics and was screened at various global international film festivals in 17 countries.

Synopsis 
Split into two different chapters, the film revolves around factory worker technician Mofe (Jude Akuwudike) and hairdresser Rosa (Temi Ami-Williams) on their quest for what they anticipate and believe will be a better life on foreign shores. Mofe wishes to go to Spain and Rosa hopes to go to Italy. However, Mofe loses his family, while Rosa fails to live up to the expectations and promise which she made to Mofe.

Cast 

 Jude Akuwudike as Mofe
 Temi Ami-Williams as Rosa
 Cynthia Ebijie as Grace
 Tomiwa Edun as Seyi
 Jacob Alexander as Peter
 Chioma Omeruah as Mama Esther
 Ejike Asiegbu as Goddey
 Sadiq Daba as Jakpor
 Imoh Eboh as nurse
 Chiemela Azurunwa as doctor

Production 
The film was announced by twin brothers Arie Esiri and Chuko Esiri as they jointly worked for the project. The film marked the directorial debut for both as they co-directed the film. The film was funded entirely in Nigeria and was shot in 16mm and was filmed across 48 locations in Lagos where the film was set. Few portions of the film were also shot in New York. The film was awarded the 2018 Purple List Award and was chosen as one of the ten projects in 2019 IFP Narrative Lab in New York.

Release  
The film has screened at various international film festivals held in South Africa, Netherlands, US, Italy, Poland, UK, Spain, Brazil, Portugal, UAE, Canada, Austria, China, Greece, Egypt, Germany and India.

The film was officially selected to be premiered in 17 countries in their respective film festivals as follows

 70th Berlin International Film Festival, Germany (24 February 2020)
 Vancouver International Film Festival, Canada (26 September 2020)
 BFI London Film Festival, UK (11 October 2020)
 2020 Film Africa
 2020 Indie Lisboa International Film Festival, Portugal
 2020 Internacional de Cinema São Paulo International Film Festival/Mostra São Paulo Film Festival, Brazil
 2020 Cinecitta International Film Festival, Netherlands
 AFI Film Festival, USA (20 October 2020)
 2020 Valladolid International Film Festival, Spain
 Sharjah Film Platform Festival, UAE
 2020 Cairo International Film Festival, Egypt
 2020 Thessaloniki International Film Festival, Greece
 2020 Karlovy Vary International Film Festival
 2020 New Horizons International Film Festival, Poland
 Torino Film Festival, Italy (24 November 2020)
 2020 Hainan Island International Film Festival, China
 Viennale, Austria
 World Panorama section of the 51st International Film Festival of India (24 January 2021)
2021 BlackStar Film Festival

Reception  
The film received positive reviews from critics. Glenn Kenny of RogerEbert.com gave it 3.5 stars out of four, writing that it is "a confident, knowing, empathetic effort. While the themes here are, of course, redolent of neorealism, the filmmakers don’t make ostentatious nods to cinema past. Their voice is their own; the camera is mobile when it needs to be, but stands still much of the time, letting the excellent cast build their characters as the events of the film test their endurance. And endurance rather than desire is what the movie is finally all about."

Writing in The New Yorker, novelist Teju Cole called it an "artful and luminous film" and "a search for how best to live." Comparing it to Wong Kar Wai’s In The Mood for Love, Asghar Farhadi’s A Separation, and Mati Diop’s Atlantics, he concludes: "It is a testament to Chuko Esiri’s compact and intelligent script that the film moves by its own persuasive logic, feeling neither like a catalogue of miseries nor a sentimental exercise in third-world pluck."

It was listed as one of the best African films of 2022.

The film maintains a "Fresh" score of 100% on Rotten Tomatoes, and an average score of 7.9, after 22 reviews by critics.

Awards and nominations 
The film received few awards and nominations at film festivals. It won the Achille Valdata Award at the 2020 Torino International Film Festival.

References

External links 

 

2020 directorial debut films
2020 films
2020 drama films
Films set in Lagos
Films shot in Lagos
2020s English-language films
English-language Nigerian films
Nigerian drama films